Atomic is a Norwegian/Swedish jazz band formed in 1999, composed of musicians from the top stratum of the European jazz circuit. Atomic has been billed as one of the most respected "new" constellations in jazz. In 2014, original drummer Paal Nilssen-Love was replaced by Hans Hulbækmo.

Members
Magnus Broo – trumpet (Stockholm, Sweden)
Fredrik Ljungkvist – saxophones, clarinet (Stockholm, Sweden)
Håvard Wiik – piano (Oslo, Norway)
Ingebrigt Håker Flaten – double bass (Oslo, Norway)
Hans Hulbækmo – drums

Former members
Paal Nilssen-Love – drums (Oslo, Norway)
Håkon Kornstad – saxophone (Oslo, Norway)

Discography 
2001: Feet Music (Jazzland)
2003: Boom Boom (Jazzland)
2004: Nuclear Assembly Hall (w/School Days) (Okka Disk)
2005: The Bikini Tapes (Jazzland) [Live] 
2006: Happy New Ears! (Jazzland)
2008: Retrograde (Jazzland)
2008: Distil (w/School Days) (Okka Disk)
2010: Theater Tilters Vol 1 (Jazzland)
2010: Theater Tilters Vol 2 (Jazzland)
2011: Here Comes Everybody (Jazzland)
2013: There's a Hole in the Mountain (Jazzland)
2015: Lucidity (Jazzland)
2017: Six Easy Pieces (ODIN Records)

See also 
Jazzland Records
Odin Records

References

External links

Official Web Site
Official MySpace Page
Bandinfo at Jazzland's website

Norwegian jazz ensembles
Swedish jazz ensembles
Spellemannprisen winners
Musical groups established in 1999
1999 establishments in Norway
1999 establishments in Sweden

Musical groups from Norway with local place of origin missing 
Musical groups from Sweden with local place of origin missing
Jazzland Recordings (1997) artists